Alfred Gatty (18 April 1813 – 20 January 1903) was a Church of England vicar and author.

He was born in London to Robert Gatty, a solicitor, and Margaret Jones. In 1831 he entered Exeter College, Oxford, graduating in 1836. He was ordained a deacon in 1837 and was appointed as curate of Bellerby in the North Riding of Yorkshire. He was ordained priest in 1838, and was appointed vicar of Ecclesfield on 23 September 1839, a position he held until his death. In 1861 he was appointed as rural dean and in 1862 as subdean of York Minster.

On 8 July 1839 he married Margaret Scott, with whom he had ten children (though two died in infancy), including the judge Stephen Herbert Gatty, the author Juliana Horatia Ewing, antiquary, author and lecturer Charles Tindal Gatty and the officer of arms and composer Alfred Scott-Gatty. Margaret died in 1873, and in 1884 Alfred Gatty married Mary Newman.

Publications
With Margaret Gatty:
1842—Recollections of the Life of the Rev. A. J. Scott, DD, Lord Nelson's Chaplain
1860—Travels and Adventures of the Rev. Joseph Wolff
1861—The Old Folks from Home
1872—The Book of Sundials

As sole author:
1848—The Bell: its Origin, History, and Uses
1881—Key to Tennyson's 'In Memoriam'
1873—Sheffield, Past and Present
1884—A Life at One Living

In 1869 he published an enlarged edition of Joseph Hunter's Hallamshire.

References

External links

 

1813 births
1903 deaths
People from Ecclesfield
Alumni of Exeter College, Oxford
19th-century English writers
19th-century English Anglican priests
Clergy from Sheffield